Antoni Maria (born 21 March 1987) is a French rugby league footballer who plays as a  for FC Lezignan in the Elite One Championship and France at international level. 

He previously played in France for the Saint-Gaudens Bears in the Elite One Championship, Toulouse Olympique French top flight and the Co-operative Championship and Saint-Esteve in the Elite One Championship. Maria then transferred to the Catalans Dragons and the Leigh Centurions in the Super League. He spent time on loan from the Dragons at Hull Kingston Rovers.

Background
Maria was born in Sainte-Livrade-sur-Lot, France.

Club career

Toulouse Olympique
Maria began his career at Toulouse Olympique in the Championship between 2009 and 2011.

Catalans Dragons
When Toulouse withdrew from the Championship, Maria joined Super League club Catalans Dragons, making his Super League début against Castleford Tigers in 2012.

Leigh Centurions
Maria joined Leigh Centurions for the 2017 season following their promotion to Super League.

Catalans Dragons (return)
In October 2017 Maria signed a two-year deal to return to Catalans Dragons.

Hull Kingston Rovers
On 25 April 2019 he joined Hull Kingston Rovers on an initial one month's loan due to an injury crisis at the East Hull outfit. He made his debut for the Robins 3 days later in the 28-24 away defeat by the Leeds Rhinos

FC Lézignan XIII
On 17 July 2020 it was reported that he had signed for FC Lézignan XIII in the Elite One Championship

International career
Maria is a France international. He was a member of the French team that played in the 2013 Rugby League World Cup, in the 2014 and 2015 European Cup tournaments. He also played for France in their 2015 European Cup mid-tournament test-match against England.

References

External links
Catalans Dragons profile
Leigh Centurions profile
France profile
2017 RLWC profile
SL profile

1987 births
Living people
Catalans Dragons players
France national rugby league team players
French rugby league players
Hull Kingston Rovers players
Leigh Leopards players
Lézignan Sangliers players
Rugby league props
Sportspeople from Lot-et-Garonne
Saint-Gaudens Bears players
Toulouse Olympique players